The 2012–13 Navy Midshipmen men's basketball team represented the United States Naval Academy during the 2012–13 NCAA Division I men's basketball season. The Midshipmen, led by second year head coach Ed DeChellis, played their home games at Alumni Hall and were members of the Patriot League. They finished the season 8–23, 2–12 in Patriot League play to finish in last place. They lost in the quarterfinals of the Patriot League tournament to Bucknell.

Roster

Schedule

|-
!colspan=9| Exhibition

|-
!colspan=9| Regular season

|-
!colspan=9| 2013 Patriot League men's basketball tournament

References

Navy Midshipmen men's basketball seasons
Navy
Navy
Navy